Sails of Silver is the eleventh studio album by British folk rock band Steeleye Span. It was released  in 1980 by Chrysalis Records. The album was produced two years after the band's ostensible break-up. At the request of Chrysalis Records Peter Knight and Bob Johnson both returned, replacing their own replacements Martin Carthy and John Kirkpatrick, who departed after the release of Live at Last.  Despite being produced by Elton John's producer Gus Dudgeon, Sails of Silver was a commercial failure, and this proved a final straw for Tim Hart, who departed the band, leaving Maddy Prior as the band's sole remaining founding member.

Although the band now sported the same line-up that had brought it to the height of its success, Sails of Silver has often been seen as embodying a different spirit from their classic albums of the 1970s. Prior to Sails of Silver, the band had always performed songs written by other people, predominantly traditional songs, but also a few 20th century pieces, such as the two Brecht songs on Storm Force Ten.  But on this album they included several songs they had written themselves, including "Let Her Go Down" and "Senior Service".  This was the beginning of a trend that continues down to the present. Every album they have released since Sails has had at least one song written by band members, and Back in Line and Bloody Men were predominantly the band's material.

Maddy Prior has said that, although she likes the album and finds it accessible, the band was in her words "lost" and not particularly confident of the material it had put together. Fans found the album jarring, although they were pleased that the band was touring again, and the band's shows always included their earlier material.

Track listing
"Sails of Silver" (Tim Hart, Bob Johnson, Rick Kemp, Peter Knight, Nigel Pegrum, Maddy Prior) – 3:27
"My Love" (Traditional, Steeleye Span) – 2:52
"Barnet Fair"(Kemp, Traditional) – 4:34
"Senior Service" (Kemp, Prior) – 3:30
"Gone to America" (Knight, Traditional) – 4:22
"Where Are They Now" (Kemp, Traditional) – 4:10
"Let Her Go Down" (Knight) – 3:36
"Longbone" (Hart, Johnson, Kemp, Knight, Pegrum, Prior)– 3:57
"Marigold/Harvest Home" (Knight, Prior, Steeleye Span)– 3:05
"Tell Me Why" (Steeleye Span, Traditional)– 3:54

Reissue
When the album was reissued in 1998, three bonus tracks were included:
"Thomas the Rhymer" (Live 1997)
"My Johnny was a Shoemaker" (Live 1996)
"The Lark in the Morning" (Live 1996)

Personnel
Steeleye Span
Maddy Prior - vocals
Tim Hart - vocals, guitar
Bob Johnson - vocals, guitar
Rick Kemp - vocals, bass guitar
Peter Knight - vocals, violin, keyboards
Nigel Pegrum - drums, percussion, woodwind

The final two tracks were recorded when Steeleye Span were supporting Status Quo on tour. The line-up for the final three tracks is as follows:

Maddy Prior - vocals
Gay Woods  - vocals
Peter Knight - vocals, violin
Bob Johnson - vocals, guitar, keyboards
Tim Harries - vocals, bass guitar
Liam Genockey - drums, percussion

References

Steeleye Span albums
1980 albums
Albums produced by Gus Dudgeon
Chrysalis Records albums